Rare and Unreleased may refer to:

 Rare and Unreleased (Burning Spear album)
 Rare and Unreleased (Curve album)